(1534–1602) was a warlord of the Japanese province of Hitachi during the Sengoku Period of the 16th century. Ujiharu was the son of Oda Masaharu and held the Oda Castle in Hitachi Province as a local power. 

When Ujiharu came to power following the year of 1548, Ujiharu was very hard pressed by the Yūki and Satake clan along with the state of his clan being in decline. 

He participated in the Siege of Odawara (1561) under Uesugi Kenshin againts Hōjō clan.

Ujiharu was defeated by the Satake following the year of 1569 and lost Oda Castle. He finally surrendered to the Satake following the year of 1583, having to give all of his family as hostages. 

After the year of 1590, Ujiharu was completely deprived of his remaining holdings. It is known that Ujiharu deeply loved renga.

Japanese nobility
1534 births
1602 deaths